Tarzan & Jane is a 2002 American animated adventure comedy film produced by Walt Disney Television Animation, Released on July 23, 2002, it is a direct-to-video sequel to the Disney's 1999 animated feature Tarzan, and uses three then-unaired episodes of the film's corresponding television series, The Legend of Tarzan. Tarzan II, a followup to the original film, was released in 2005. The film is set one year after the events of the first film and Tarzan and Jane are married.

With the exceptions of Erik Von Detten and Jason Marsden as Flynt and Mungo respectively, none of the actors from the original film reprised their roles.

This film was dedicated to storyboard artist John Miller, who died before the film was released.

Plot
The film makes use of a frame tale to present three self-contained "episodes" via flashback. Jane and Tarzan's first wedding anniversary has arrived, and Jane is trying to find a suitable present for her husband, with the help of the elephant Tantor and the gorilla Terk.

When a party is suggested, the trio remembers the disaster that occurred when three of Jane's friends arrived to rescue her, as they mistakenly believed Jane was being held captive in the jungle. After learning the truth, they decide to stay for a visit. Jane organizes an English-style picnic for her friends, but Tarzan refuses to join them after believing Jane was embarrassed by his savage habits. The picnic is interrupted when two panthers, Nuru and Sheeta attack Jane and her friends, forcing them to flee into the deeper regions of the jungle. As Jane taught her friends a few survival techniques, they are once again ambushed by the panthers, only to be saved when Tarzan rushes in. When Jane and her friends leave the next day, they thank her for the adventure and say they hope to come back soon.

Back to the present day, Jane ponders over the idea of expensive gifts, particularly jewelry, prompting Terk to remind her of the time Tarzan tried to get her a diamond. Tarzan had led two men, Johannes Niels and Merkus to a nearby volcano containing a diamond mine and in return, they would give him one of the diamonds to give to Jane, only for them to turn on him once inside, wanting to take all the diamonds for themselves. The volcano then erupted with Tarzan, Jane, and Professor Porter trapped inside, though they managed to escape before the lava flows reached them. Tarzan then rescued Johannes and Merkus, only for them to lose their diamonds in the process. They are arrested after this and taken back to England.

Professor Porter then joins the conversation, suggesting to Jane that she and Tarzan should celebrate their anniversary with a dance. This causes Terk to bring up the time Jane's old friend Robert Canler visited. Things had gone well, despite Tarzan feeling jealous and mistrusting towards Canler (claiming that he is a bad man that reminds him of Sabor), until Canler had revealed he was working as a double agent for the Germans of the German Empire during World War I and had come for a code machine disguised as a music box he gave to Jane for safekeeping. He then kidnapped her, but was tracked down and stopped by Tarzan assisted by RAF pilot Nigel Taylor, who had been on Canler's trail. Taylor commandeers Canler's plane and takes him back to England to stand trial.

Having run out of ideas and realizing anniversaries would not fit in with Tarzan's uncivilized lifestyle, Jane returns to the treehouse in disappointment, only to cheer up after finding it decorated and everyone, including Tarzan, who is wearing his father's suit, had planned a surprise party to make her happy. Terk, Tantor, and the Professor had known about it all along and were simply distracting her while everyone else got the party set up. Tarzan gives Jane a diamond ring made from the same diamonds in the volcano. The celebrations start as everyone dances, including Tarzan and Jane as the film concludes with the couple dancing under the moonlight with fireflies all around.

Cast
 Michael T. Weiss as Tarzan
 Olivia d'Abo as Jane Porter
 April Winchell as Terk
 Jim Cummings as Tantor and Merkus
 John O'Hurley as Johannes Niels
 Jeff Bennett as Prof. Archimedes Q. Porter and Robert (Bobby) Canler
 Alexis Denisof as Nigel Taylor
 Grey DeLisle-Griffin as Greenly
 Nicollette Sheridan as Eleanor
 Tara Strong as Hazel
 René Auberjonois as Renard Dumont
 Frank Welker as Nuru and Sheeta

Reception 
Rotten Tomatoes, a review aggregator, reports that 17% of six surveyed critics gave the film a positive review; the average rating is 3/10.  TV Guide rated it 3/5 stars and called it "sprightly amusement for kids of all ages".

The Legend of Tarzan
This film is largely a flashback to three episodes of the TV series The Legend of Tarzan: "Tarzan and the British Invasion", "Tarzan and the Volcanic Diamond Mine" and "Tarzan and the Flying Ace", the last three episodes of the show to be aired (but taking place much earlier in production order).

An adventure game on the DVD is based on the series. It resembles a multiple-choice story, featuring many different characters from the series.

References

External links

Official Website

2002 films
2002 animated films
2002 direct-to-video films
2000s American animated films
2000s fantasy adventure films
2000s romance films
American fantasy adventure films
American sequel films
Animated adventure films
Animated films about gorillas
Animated romance films
Direct-to-video sequel films
Tarzan (franchise)
DisneyToon Studios animated films
Disney direct-to-video animated films
Films set in the 1900s
Films set in Africa
Love stories
Tarzan films
Disney Television Animation films
2000s children's animated films
Films directed by Steve Loter
2000s English-language films